A loom is a device used to weave cloth.

Loom or LOOM may also refer to:

Arts
 Loom (video game), a graphical adventure game
 Light Opera of Manhattan, an Off-Broadway repertory theatre company
 Looms, fictional machines in the expanded universe of the television series Doctor Who; see Other
Loom (band), an English rock band from Warwickshire
The Loom, American rock band

Other uses
 Loom, West Virginia, US
 Wiring loom, an electrical cable assembly or harness
 Rainbow Loom, a plastic toy loom used to weave colorful rubber bands into bracelets and charms
 LOOM (ontology), a knowledge representation language
 Loyal Order of Moose
 Loom,_Inc., a technology company

See also
 Heirloom
 Loon (disambiguation)